Antigenidas, son of Simylus, (fl. 4th century BC) was a cavalryman from Orchomenus, who served with Alexander's allied cavalry until the expedition reached Ecbatana in 330 BC. There he and his compatriots were discharged. On their return around 329, they made a dedication to Zeus Soter in Orchomenus.

References

Suidas and Harpocrat. s. v.; Plut. de Alex. fort. p. 355, a., de Music, p. 1138, a.; Cic. Brut. 50 ; Bode, Gescli. d. lyrisch. Diclitkunst d. Hellenen ii. p. 3*21, &c.
Who's Who in the Age of Alexander the Great by Waldemar Heckel 

4th-century BC Greek people
Ancient Boeotians
Soldiers of Alexander the Great